1922 Emperor's Cup Final was the 2nd final of the Emperor's Cup competition. The final was played at Toshima Shihan Ground in Tokyo on November 26, 1922. Nagoya Shukyu-Dan won the championship.

Overview
Nagoya Shukyu-Dan won their 1st title, by defeating Hiroshima Koto-Shihan 1–0.

Match details

See also
1922 Emperor's Cup

References

Emperor's Cup
1922 in Japanese football